Ezzeldin Mohamed Ali Bahader (born 3 November 1945) is an Egyptian former footballer who played as a forward. He is known for being the oldest professional footballer to play in an official game, at 74 years.

Career
On 7 March 2020, Guinness World Records named Bahader the oldest active football player at 74 years and 125 days. He broke Israeli goalkeeper Isaak Hayik's record, who had become the oldest on 5 April 2019 at the age of 73.

On 9 March 2020, Bahader made his debut for 6th of October, scoring a penalty against Genius in the Egyptian Third Division. He became the oldest footballer to score in an official game.

On 17 October 2020, Bahader became the oldest footballer in history, aged 74 years and 348 days, playing against El Ayat Sports in a  3–2 defeat.

Personal life
Bahader is a civil engineer by trade. He has six grandchildren.

References

1945 births
Living people
Egyptian footballers
Association football forwards